We Found a Hat is a 2016 children's picture book by the Canadian author and illustrator Jon Klassen. It is about two turtles that come across a hat and what occurs when they decide to leave it be. In October 2019, Candlewick Press, the book's publisher, released a boxed set featuring We Found a Hat along with its two companion books (This Is Not My Hat and I Want My Hat Back), calling it Jon Klassen’s Hat Box. In 2018, Weston Woods Studios, Inc. made an animated version of this book, narrated by Johnny Heller and Christopher Curry.

Reception
We Found a Hat was received favorably, with a number of starred reviews including from Publishers Weekly, Quill & Quire, the School Library Journal, and Booklist.

The New York Journal of Books wrote "The ending feels almost wrong, a bit too easy, too happily ever after but only in my dreams." and concluded "We Found a Hat and the trilogy as a whole provides an entertaining, easy to read story on one level but also grants plenty of space for more complex and lively discussion."

It has also been reviewed by The Globe and Mail. Common Sense Media, Kirkus Reviews, and The Horn Book.

See also

I Want My Hat Back
This is Not My Hat

References

2016 children's books
American children's books
American picture books
Books about turtles
Canadian children's books
Canadian picture books
Candlewick Press books